Arfanul Haque Rifat is a Bangladeshi Awami League politician who is the incumbent mayor of Comilla City Corporation. Rifat is serving as the general secretary of Comilla city unit Awami League since 2017.

Career 
Rifat joined the Chhatra League in 1976 and became president of its Comilla city unit after two years. He also served as a senior vice-president of the district unit of Jubo League. He is serving as District Football Association president since 2010. In 2022 Cumilla City Corporation election, Rifat defeated his closest rival former BNP leader Monirul Haque Sakku by a margin of only 343 votes. He takes oath on 5 June 2022 by Prime Minister Sheikh Hasina as 2nd Mayor of Cumilla City Corporation (CUSIC).

Controversies 
Rifat was listed number one patrons of drug dealers and smugglers in Cumilla according to a government agency which was listed by prime ministers office in 2018, according to The Daily Star, Vorer Kagoj, Prothom Alo and other credible media. Though, the leaders of Awami League denied the allegations.

References

Living people
Awami League politicians
Year of birth missing (living people)
Mayors of Comilla
People from Comilla District